Melendugno (Salentino:  or ) is a town and comune in the  province of Lecce in the Apulia region of south-east Italy.

It is known for its marine, which are bathing beaches on the Adriatic Sea: Roca Vecchia, San Foca, Torre dell'Orso and Torre Sant'Andrea, which were awarded the Blue Flag beach prize for the water quality. Melendugno also includes the frazione of Borgagne.

See also
 Torre Sant'Andrea di Missipezza Lighthouse

References

Cities and towns in Apulia
Localities of Salento
Coastal towns in Apulia